Code of the Prairie is a 1944 American Western film directed by Spencer Gordon Bennet and written by Albert DeMond and Anthony Coldeway. The film stars Smiley Burnette, Sunset Carson, Peggy Stewart, Weldon Heyburn, Tom Chatterton and Roy Barcroft. The film was released on October 6, 1944, by Republic Pictures.

Plot

Cast  
Smiley Burnette as Frog
Sunset Carson as Sunset Carson
Peggy Stewart as Helen Matson
Weldon Heyburn as Jess Wyatt
Tom Chatterton as Bat Matson
Roy Barcroft as Professor Graham
Bud Geary as Henchman Lem
Tom London as Henchman Loomis
Jack Kirk as Henchman Boggs
Tom Steele as Henchman Burley

See also
List of American films of 1944

References

External links 
 

1944 films
1940s English-language films
American Western (genre) films
1944 Western (genre) films
Republic Pictures films
Films directed by Spencer Gordon Bennet
American black-and-white films
1940s American films